Harold Barefoot Sanders Jr. (February 5, 1925 – September 21, 2008) was an American attorney, politician, and jurist who served as a United States district judge of the United States District Court for the Northern District of Texas and counsel to President Lyndon B. Johnson. He was best known for overseeing the lawsuit to desegregate the Dallas Independent School District.

Early life and education

Sanders was born in Dallas, Texas to H.B. Sanders, and the former May Elizabeth Forrester. "Barefoot" was the maiden name of his paternal grandmother, Dennie Barefoot. Early in his life, Sanders went by "H.B." He graduated from North Dallas High School in 1942. He served in the United States Navy during World War II between 1943 and 1946. While attending the University of Texas, Sanders was elected student body president in 1947. He was affiliated with Phi Delta Theta, Blue Key, Phi Delta Phi, Phi Delta Kappa and the Texas Cowboys. Sanders received a Bachelor of Arts degree from the University of Texas at Austin in 1949, and a Juris Doctor in 1950 from the University of Texas School of Law.

Career 
Sanders worked in private practice with the Dallas law firm of Clark, West, Keller, Sanders and Butler from 1950 through 1961 and from 1969 until 1979.

Texas House of Representatives 
A Democrat, Sanders served in the Texas House of Representatives from 1953 to 1959. During his tenure in the Texas Legislature, he sponsored the Texas Securities Act, the Texas Probate Code, the Texas Mental Health Code, and legislation creating the Trinity River Authority. In 1958, Sanders ran for Texas's 5th congressional district, but lost in the general election to Republican incumbent Bruce Alger.

United States attorney 
In 1961, President John F. Kennedy appointed Sanders United States attorney for the Northern District of Texas, a position he held until 1965. During his time as United States Attorney, Sanders played a minor role in the transition of power between Presidents Kennedy and Johnson following Kennedy's assassination in Dallas on November 22, 1963. Sanders was, according to an interview, tasked with finding Federal District Judge Sarah T. Hughes to administer the oath of office to Johnson:

Johnson administration 
From 1965 to 1967, Sanders served as Assistant Deputy Attorney General and Assistant Attorney General in the United States Department of Justice in Washington, D.C. and was instrumental in the passage of the Voting Rights Act of 1965. In 1967, President Lyndon Johnson appointed him Legislative Counsel to the President to manage the White House legislative program.

Failed nomination to the D.C. Circuit 
In 1968, Johnson nominated Sanders to a seat on the United States Court of Appeals for the District of Columbia Circuit. Johnson's presidency ended before the United States Senate cast a vote on Sanders's nomination, and President Richard Nixon did not renominate Sanders. Nixon appointed George MacKinnon to that seat instead.

1972 United States Senate campaign 

In the 1972 Democratic primary, Sanders faced former Senator Ralph William Yarborough of Austin for the right to challenge two-term incumbent Republican John G. Tower in the general election. Yarborough had lost his seat in the primary in 1970 to Lloyd M. Bentsen of Houston. The established leader of the Texas liberal Democratic faction, Yarborough nearly won on the first ballot, but Sanders received enough votes to force him into a runoff. In the second primary, Sanders prevailed, 1,008,499 (52.1 percent) to 928,132 (47.9 percent).

In the general election campaign, Tower attempted to link Sanders, also considered a liberal by Texas standards, with the Democratic presidential nominee, then-U.S. Senator George McGovern of South Dakota, who was waging an uphill challenge to Richard Nixon. In his memoir, Consequences: A Personal and Political Memoir, Tower recalled: "I linked Harold Sanders to McGovern whenever I could. I hung Attorney General Ramsey Clark around his neck. Clark was an old associate of Sanders's and had made a $2,000 contribution to the Sanders campaign. 'I'm glad,' one of my standard zingers went, 'that Ramsey Clark is supporting my opponent, an old crony of his. . . . Frankly, I don't welcome the support of anyone who goes to Hanoi and condemns our country.'"

In the campaign, Tower prevailed by 311,000 votes, the high-water mark of his electoral career. Tower received 1,822,877 votes (53.4 percent) to Sanders's 1,511,985 (44.3 percent). Six years later in 1978, Tower edged the Democratic United States Representative (later appointed Senator) Bob Krueger by only 12,227 votes.

Federal judicial service 
On February 6, 1979, President Jimmy Carter nominated Sanders to a new seat on the United States District Court for the Northern District of Texas created by 92 Stat. 1629. He was confirmed by the United States Senate on April 24, 1979, and received his commission two days later. Sanders served as chief judge of the Northern District of Texas from 1989 to 1995. During his tenure as a federal district judge, Sanders held many positions on committees related to the function of the judiciary. He served as chair of the Judicial Conference Committee on the Judicial Branch (1994–97); as a member of the Judicial Panel on Multidistrict Litigation (1992–2000); and as chair, National Conference of Federal Trial Judges, American Bar Association (1988–89). He assumed senior status on January 1, 1996. Sanders took inactive senior status on July 7, 2006. His service was terminated on September 21, 2008, due to his death.

Dallas ISD desegregation lawsuit 
Though Sanders handled thousands of civil and criminal cases during his tenure as a federal judge, he is best known in Texas for his role as judge in the Tasby v. Estes litigation brought against the Dallas Independent School District in the 1970s, in which plaintiff Sam Tasby charged that the Dallas ISD was still a segregated school district. The litigation began before Sanders became a federal judge, but he took over the case until its conclusion in 2003, and had oversight of many Dallas ISD activities related to racial balance until that time. Though the Tasby litigation was not the first desegregation lawsuit against Dallas ISD, it is the most famous.

Until 1961, Dallas was the largest city in the South with a segregated school system. That same year, the Dallas ISD school board implemented a desegregation plan — the so-called "Stairstep Plan" — under order of the Fifth Circuit Court of Appeals. In September of that year, eighteen black students started first grade classes in what had been whites-only institutions.

In spite of tremendous dissatisfaction with Dallas ISD and continual complaints by the Dallas NAACP, Dallas ISD declared itself desegregated in 1967. Litigation that continued for three more decades proved that declaration inappropriate.

Sam Tasby filed a lawsuit against Dallas ISD charging discrimination prohibited under Brown v. Board of Education on October 6, 1970. Federal Judge William M. Taylor presided over a trial of the case from July 12 to July 16, 1971, and ordered the school district to come up with a new desegregation plan, which the district published on July 23, 1971.

Four years later, in July 1975, the United States Court of Appeals for the Fifth Circuit rejected several parts of the plan and ordered a new desegregation plan implemented by January 1976. Other parties, including the NAACP, were added to the suit.

On February 2, 1976, Judge Taylor presided over a second desegregation trial, and by April, a new desegregation plan was issued. The Fifth Circuit rejected most of this plan as well. The most controversial part of this plan centered around busing, and Judge Taylor held an additional hearing on the case. Taylor removed himself from the case on March 21, 1981, to "avoid any further possibility that a desegregation plan might be overturned," and the case was assigned to Judge Sanders.

After additional hearings, Sanders ruled that Dallas ISD continued to show signs of racial segregation, but concluded that busing would not solve the problem. He ordered parties to submit new desegregation plans, and then issued his own, ordering:

This Judgment constitutes the Desegregation Plan for the Dallas Independent School District ("DISD" or "the District") and is rendered pursuant to, and is to be construed in the light of and consistent with, (1) the Court's Memorandum Opinion dated August 3, 1981; (2) the Stipulation dated December 1, 1981, and approved by the Court on December 2, 1981; and (3) the Court's Memorandum Opinions and Orders dated December 7, 1981; December 21, 1981; January 4, 1982; and February 1, 1982. This Judgment supersedes the final judgment rendered by this Court in 1976. All programs provided for in this Judgment must be initiated by the beginning of the DISD 1982-83 school year, or sooner if feasible, unless otherwise herein provided.

The school district fought Sanders decision until August, 1983, when the Fifth Circuit upheld Sanders' plan; at that time, the Dallas ISD board of trustees unanimously accepted the court's decision.

On January 9, 2003, a formal hearing was held to determine the legal status of the Dallas ISD. Some members of the public said that the desegregation, while a good thing, did more harm than good and as a result of the white flight than occurred in the late 1970s and early 1980s the school district had swung from predominantly white to predominantly minority. Sanders offered no answer to any of the public questions but concluded the session by taking all comments into advisement.

Decades of oversight finally came to an end in June 2003, when Sanders ruled that Dallas ISD was no longer subject to his oversight and was desegregated.

The segregation prohibited by the United States Constitution, the United States Supreme Court and federal statutes no longer exists in the DISD...

Sanders's work in the desegregation case made him the occasional target of hostile telephone calls and letters. He once said that Dallas was accustomed to segregation, and many whites were content with the status quo.

During the summer of 2009, Sanders was honored by the Dallas ISD when the Board of Trustees renamed the School of Government, Law, & Law Enforcement to Judge Barefoot Sanders Law Magnet.

Personal life

Sanders was married to the former Jan Scurlock. He and his wife had four children. Scurlock was an activist for SANE/FREEZE (now Peace Action).

His oldest daughter, Janet, is a judge on the Massachusetts Superior Court. His son, Harold III, is a musician, composer, and owner of Barefoot Music; his best-known work is the theme to the reality TV competition series Top Chef.

See also
 Lyndon B. Johnson judicial appointment controversies

References

External links
Northern District of Texas biography
 

1925 births
2008 deaths
Military personnel from Dallas
Dallas Independent School District
Judges of the United States District Court for the Northern District of Texas
United States district court judges appointed by Jimmy Carter
20th-century American judges
University of Texas School of Law alumni
Candidates in the 1972 United States elections
Methodists from Texas
United States Attorneys for the Northern District of Texas
United States Assistant Attorneys General for the Civil Division
Democratic Party members of the Texas House of Representatives
United States Navy sailors
United States Navy reservists